The Ugalla River National Park (Ugalla River National Park) is found in Tabora Region, of west-central Tanzania. It is bounded on the south by the Ugalla River. The National Park was established in 2019 after the Tanzanian parliament separated part of the Ugalla River Game reserve to form a national park. It is located in the central-western part of Tanzania, in the eastern part of Lake Tanganyika.

The whole area is a spacious landscape dominated by Miombo forests and high grassy savannas inhabited by buffaloes, elephants, leopards, giraffes, zebras, etc.

The average amount of rainfall is 600-750 mm per annum.

References

National parks of Tanzania
Geography of Tabora Region
Important Bird Areas of Tanzania